Satya Hegde (born 17 May 1975) is an Indian cinematographer who works in Kannada cinema. He made his debut with Taali Kattuva Shubhavele in 2002. Following this, he worked in over 20 films and received critical praise for his work in Duniya (2007) and Myna (2013), along with his collaborations with Suri.

Early life
Satya Hegde was born on 17 May 1975 to a Brahmin family of Parameshwar Hegde and Savithri in Haliyal, Uttara Kannada, Karnataka. He completed his schooling from Carmel High School, Haliyal in 1989. Following this, he was sent to Sanduru to complete his Pre-university course by his father who then wanted him to pursue a career in Computer science. Due to his poor scores during the course, he was persuaded by his brother to obtain a diploma. Having decided to choose cinematography as the subject specialization at the Sri Jayachamarajendra Polytechnic, Bangalore, Hegde obtained the diploma in cinematography in 1995.

Career
Hegde began his career as a cinematographer assisting B. C. Gowrishankar, a popular cinematographer of the time. He also worked with Ashok Kashyap,   P.Rajan, H.C.Venu, P.K.H. Das,Surendranath Begur and Krishna. During the time, he worked in making corporate videos, documentary films, television advertisements and in soap operas such as Ankura and Swarnarekhe. He worked as a camera operator and an assistant cinematographer in the Kannada language films Sparsha (2000), Parva (2002) and H2O. In the same year, he started out as an independent cinematographer in films with the film Taali Kattuva Shubhavele. He then worked in the 2005 releases Yashwanth and Masala, both of which failed to perform commercially. Following this, Hegde worked with Ashok Kashyap in a soap opera before returning to films with the 2007 film Duniya for which he won praise for his work from critics.

His work in Myna (2013), that was shot mostly outdoors with simulated lighting won him praise. He then worked in Gajakesari (2014) collaborating with Krishna, a cinematographer himself, as the director. He received praise for his work in Rhaatee, with critics calling it a "visual poetry"; it involved frames of Bangalore and Muthathi forest. For his work in Rhaatee, he was awarded the Best Cinematographer at the 2014 Karnataka State Film Awards.

Filmography

References

External links
 
 

1975 births
Living people
People from Uttara Kannada
Kannada film cinematographers
Kannada Brahmins
Cinematographers from Karnataka